A Love Letter to You 3 is the third commercial mixtape by American rapper Trippie Redd. It was released on November 9, 2018, by Caroline Distribution. It is the third release in his A Love Letter to You series, of which began in May 2017. The mixtape features collaborations with YoungBoy Never Broke Again, Juice Wrld, and Tory Lanez, among others. It is supported by the lead single "Topanga", for which a music video was released on October 30.

Background and recording
Trippie Redd stated on his social media that he recorded the album in two weeks "right after Life's a Trip", and called it "lowkey better". Speaking about the mixtape to Zane Lowe on Beats 1, Trippie Redd said: "The way I set up my projects, I put the first track to the last track. If you listen to it from start to finish, that's how I put it together. It's art, it's not anything to play with." On the content of A Love Letter to You 3, Trippie Redd told Lowe: "It has some stuff about relationships, but that's life. 'Toxic Waste' is about a toxic relationship. What you hear is mixed — everybody has to mix their vocals for how it's supposed to sound. When I record, I do use autotune, but I don't use it how people use it. I like samples a lot."

Promotion
In September 2018, Trippie Redd stated that the mixtape was "already done" but that he needed 2–3 more songs to complete it, and released an audio clip of "Topanga". On October 30, he released the cover art and track listing, which originally featured "Blastoff" and "Talk That Shit", which did not make the final cut.

Commercial performance
On the chart dated November 24, 2018, A Love Letter to You 3 debuted at number three on the US Billboard 200 with 84,000 album-equivalent units (including 11,000 pure album sales). It is Trippie Redd's second US top-10 album. It was also the week's most-streamed album overall, with its tracks achieving 108.8 million on-demand streams. In its second week, the mixtape dropped to number nine on the chart, earning 41,000 units.

Track listing

Personnel

 Trippie Redd – primary artist, composition
 Baby Goth – featured artist 
 Elliott Trent - featured artist, production, composition
 Emani22 - featured artist
 Juice WRLD - featured artist, composition
 Kodie Shane - featured artist, composition
 Nel-Denarro - featured artist, composition
 Tory Lanez - featured artist, composition, engineering
 YoungBoy Never Broke Again - featured artist, composition
 808-H - producer
 ChopsquadDJ - producer
 Dez Wright - producer
 Diplo - producer
 Foreign Tek - producer
 Goose the Guru - producer
 Da Honorable C.N.O.T.E. - producer
 Icon South - producer
 Jacob Reske - producer
 King Henry - producer
 Krischordz - producer
 Nellz - producer
 OZ - producer
 Pas Beats - producer
 Rex Kudo - producer
 Staccato - producer
 Tariq Beats - producer
 Tony Trouble - producer
 WE ARE THE STARS - producer, composition
 Nick Barbs - A&R
 Rocket Da Goon - additional vocals
 Play Picasso - additional mixing
 Koen Heldens – mixing
 Brandon Brown – mixing assistance

Charts

Weekly charts

Year-end charts

Certifications

References

2018 mixtape albums
Trippie Redd albums
Albums produced by Diplo
Sequel albums